The 2002–03 Xavier Musketeers men's basketball team represented Xavier University from Cincinnati, Ohio, in the 2002–03 season. Led by head coach Thad Matta, the Musketeers finished 26–6 (15–1 A10), and won the Atlantic 10 regular season title, but made an early exit from the Atlantic 10 tournament. In the NCAA tournament, the Musketeers handled Troy State in the opening round before falling to No. 6 seed and defending NCAA champion Maryland in the second round.

Roster

Schedule and results

|-
!colspan=9 style=| Regular season

|-
!colspan=9 style=| Atlantic 10 Tournament

|-
!colspan=9 style=| NCAA Tournament

Rankings

NBA draft

References

Xavier
Xavier Musketeers men's basketball seasons
Xavier